Dioryctria castanea is a species of snout moth in the genus Dioryctria. It was described by John David Bradley in 1969 and is known from India.

Adults have a distinctive purplish or reddish chestnut brown coloration of the forewings.

Larvae have been reared on Pinus kesiya.

References

Moths described in 1969
castanea